is a Japanese football player who plays as Midfielder and currently play for Tiamo Hirakata.

Career 
After being picker as a special designated player in 2017, Shimazu signed for Zweigen Kanazawa in the following year.

On 5 August 2021, Shimazu was loaned out to J3 club Kagoshima United from Zweigen Kanazawa.

On 8 January 2022, after his loan at Kagoshima expired, he was loaned out once again, now to JFL club Tiamo Hirakata for the 2022 season. Tiamo decided to signing him in 17 December 2022 on a full transfer.

Career statistics

Club
Updated to the start of 2023 season.

References

External links

Profile at J. League
Profile at Zweigen Kanazawa
Profile at Kagoshima United
Profile at FC Tiamo Hirakata

1999 births
Living people
Association football people from Osaka Prefecture
Japanese footballers
J2 League players
J3 League players
Japan Football League players
Zweigen Kanazawa players
Kagoshima United FC players
FC Tiamo Hirakata players
Association football midfielders